William F. Hiatt (born 1947) is a male former boxer who competed for England.

Boxing career
Hiatt won the 1966 Amateur Boxing Association British light-welterweight title, when boxing out of the Battersea ABC.

The A.B.A. success led him to being chosen for the 1966 British Empire and Commonwealth Games in Kingston, Jamaica where he represented England in the 63.5 kg light-welterweight.

He continued to box for England throughout his career.

References

1947 births
English male boxers
Boxers at the 1966 British Empire and Commonwealth Games
Living people
Light-welterweight boxers
Commonwealth Games competitors for England